Teign School is an 11–18 academy school located in Kingsteignton, a town to the north of Newton Abbot. The original 1936 building has been expanded upon substantially and numerous additional buildings have been constructed within the grounds. The school has entry level at Year 7. The school also has a sixth form centre. In 2004 it was awarded specialist Science status by the Specialist Schools Trust. The most recent Ofsted inspection was on 16 April 2015 which resulted in a 'good' rating.

Houses
The student body is divided into five houses, represented by different star constellations. Each student is sorted into one of these houses upon entry into the school. The five houses are named after five constellations and are:
 Centaurus
 Lyra
 Orion
 Pegasus
 Phoenix

The houses compete against each other in academic and sporting disciplines, each contributing towards house points. The house with maximum points is declared the House of the Year and is presented with medals for everyone inside the winning house.

Blocks
The school has eight blocks, each managing different subjects.
A Block offers Science on the lower floors and Maths on the upper floors. There are five science labs in this block.
S Block (also known as T (technology) Block) has science and technology rooms downstairs with science labs, including A-Level labs for use by Sixth Formers. A 'woodwork', or resistant material room, is accompanied by two cooking rooms located downstairs. Upstairs sees three computer rooms, more science labs and a graphics room.
L Block is used for the Sixth Form students, containing some Sixth Form teaching rooms (also used for GCSE Psychology) and teaching rooms for BVC (Beliefs, Values and Citizenship (commonly known as Religious Studies)) There is a 'Business Studies ICT room' located upstairs, as well as the ICT Office and the school's Library. L Block is the eldest block in the school and also sees the recently opened Sixth Form Study Centre which features a special computer room and work area for Sixth Formers, and an office for Sixth Form year leaders, administrator and department leader.
K Block has English rooms downstairs with Media and Art upstairs. This block also features the 'Canteign', the school's canteen, which opens before school and during lunchtime and breaktime. 'K-Hall' is sometimes used for physical education, but this is more frequently taught and practised in the school's sports centre. K Block also has an extended part of the building known as 'OC'. This extension is home of the classroom OC1 and rooms OC2 and OC3, home of the Inclusion Department.
J Block is home of the History and Geography departments. The majority of the History classrooms are downstairs and the majority of Geography classrooms are upstairs, although the History department office is situated on the first floor, whilst the Geography department office is situated on the ground floor. Also on the ground floor is the main reception, along with the headteacher's office and 'Year 8 Receptionist' desk (used by Year 8s, in which each day two different students spend a day off-timetable to experience being a receptionist). 
The Drama and Music Block is home to Drama, Music and the Templer Theatre. The Templer Theatre is the location of drama lessons, assemblies and drama productions. The music rooms in the school have sound-proofed rooms within them, used by music teachers, who use the room to teach students instruments such as the drums, guitar, violin and keyboard.
D Block is the block of modern foreign languages.
The Teign School Sports Centre is the most recently built building in the school. Built on part of the school's field, the sports centre is the home of two indoor male and female changing rooms and two outdoor male and female changing rooms. It also contains the physical education department office and a dance studio. The main hall in the block has 5 badminton courts and a full-sized basketball court within it. It is annually used for a whole school assembly in September, in which the headteacher welcomes new Year 7 students and each of them performs their House pledge. The gym, which is open to the public, is also used during school hours for the students. Students will change the sports they're doing in physical education lessons throughout terms and at the beginning of Key Stage 4, there is a choice of contact and non-contact sports groups. The contact sports group will do football and rugby, whilst the non-contact sports groups will do sports such as athletics and table tennis. All students will spend time in the gym during the academic year and all will have the opportunity to go swimming during their physical education lessons in Year 7 and 9. Unfortunately, as a consequence of the building's construction, the field's athletics track has been reduced from a full-sized 400m track to a 300m track.

Tuberculosis outbreak
In 2015 there was an outbreak of Tuberculosis (TB) at the school. On 25 March 2015, the headteacher Mark Woodlock sent a letter to students and parents explaining that "a student in Year 10 at Teign School has been diagnosed with Tuberculosis". In all about two hundred pupils were diagnosed with latent TB (the form of the disease which is not infectious) and ten were treated for the more serious, active form of TB. The initial infection probably came from a pupil from overseas who was not diagnosed with TB until he left the school in the summer of 2014. His former classmates were tested in February 2015 with additional screening in April of years 10 to 12 and then finally the whole school in June. Public Health England (PHE) which was responsible for the screening programme followed national guidelines that restrict screening firstly to family and former classmates.  However, in October Dr Sarah Harrison, deputy director of health protection for PHE said that the testing "could have been done a bit quicker, and I think certainly for an infectious teenager we would be expecting things to happen a bit more quickly than they did". The story caught the attention of many local and national newspapers, including the BBC which broadcast an episode of Inside Out South West on the outbreak.

References

External links
 Home Page
 UK Schools & Colleges Database

Academies in Devon
Secondary schools in Devon
Kingsteignton